The 1985 U.S. Indoor Championships was a men's tennis tournament played on indoor carpet courts that was part of the 1985 Nabisco Grand Prix. It was the 15th edition of the tournament and was played at the Racquet Club of Memphis in Memphis, Tennessee in the United States from January 28 to February 3, 1985. Ninth-seeded Stefan Edberg won the singles title.

Finals

Singles

 Stefan Edberg defeated  Yannick Noah 6–1, 6–0
 It was Edberg's first singles title of the year and the second of his career.

Doubles

 Pavel Složil /  Tomáš Šmíd defeated  Kevin Curren /  Steve Denton 1–6, 6–3, 6–4
 It was Složil's 1st title of the year and the 27th of his career. It was Šmíd's 1st title of the year and the 33rd of his career.

Prize money

*per team

References

External links
 ITF tournament edition details

U.S. Indoor Championships
U.S. National Indoor Championships
U.S. National Indoor Tennis Championships
U.S. National Indoor Tennis Championships
U.S. National Indoor Tennis Championships
U.S. National Indoor Tennis Championships